Blue Movie (German title: Das Porno-Haus von Amsterdam) is a German/Dutch film from 1971. The film was directed by Wim Verstappen, written by Verstappen and Charles Gormley, and stars Hugo Metsers and Carry Tefsen. The film was controversial at the time for being the first Dutch theatrical movie to show sex scenes and an erection.  Originally the Central Commission for Film Approval didn't allow its release, but director Verstappen wrote a letter of defense, claiming the picture was a criticism of society. The film was greenlighted and became a box office success, one of the most attended films in Dutch film history with admissions of over 2.3 million.

Sources

External links
 

1971 films
1970s erotic drama films
Dutch erotic drama films
German erotic drama films
West German films
1970s Dutch-language films
Obscenity controversies in film
Film controversies in the Netherlands
Censorship in the arts
1970s German films